Otto Bock (born 22 September 1881, date of death unknown) was a German-born Danish athlete.

Bock competed for Denmark at the 1906 Intercalated Games, taking part in the men's 100 metres, long jump and high jump events.

References 

1881 births
20th-century deaths
Athletes (track and field) at the 1906 Intercalated Games
Olympic athletes of Denmark
Sportspeople from Braunschweig
Danish male sprinters
Danish male long jumpers
Danish male high jumpers